"Easy Come, Easy Go" is a song written by Aaron Barker and Dean Dillon, and recorded by American country music artist George Strait. It was released in August 1993 as the lead single from his album of the same title. The song reached the top of the Billboard Hot Country Singles & Tracks (now Hot Country Songs) chart and on the Canadian RPM Country Tracks chart. It peaked at number 71 on the U.S. Billboard Hot 100, making it a minor crossover hit.

Content
A breakup song, the narrator discusses how he and his lover have agreed to mutually end their relationship because they weren't meant to be with each other.

Chart performance
The song debuted at number 57 on the Hot Country Singles & Tracks chart dated August 21, 1993. It charted for 20 weeks on that chart, and spent two weeks at Number One on the chart dated October 23, 1993. It also peaked at number 71 on the Billboard Hot 100, becoming Strait's first entry on that chart.

Charts

Year-end charts

Certifications

References

1993 singles
1993 songs
George Strait songs
Songs written by Dean Dillon
Song recordings produced by Tony Brown (record producer)
Songs written by Aaron Barker
MCA Records singles